Nollendorfplatz is a Berlin U-Bahn station on lines U1, U2, U3, and U4. It opened in 1902, and today is the only station in Berlin that is served by four U-Bahn lines, and the only one served by all of the Kleinprofil (small profile) lines.

Overview
The station, and the plaza named after Nakléřov in the Czech Republic, lies in the north of Schöneberg at the junction of Motzstraße, Kleiststraße and Bülowstraße.  The area is an important centre of gay culture, and the nearby Winterfeldtplatz is home to a well known market.  It became a more run down centre of heroin addiction, punks, and squatters in the 1970s and early 1980s, and has seen a comeback into the (somewhat intellectual) mainstream culture with higher rents and upscale restaurants and bookshops. In this it resembles (and indeed was a role model for) the western part of Kreuzberg.  In 2002, the station was given an Art Nouveau styled dome, which resembles the one it had before World War Two, designed by Cremer & Wolffenstein.

Gallery

References

External links

 Hoch- und Untergrundbahnhof Nollendorfplatz entry in the list of Berlin cultural monuments 

U1 (Berlin U-Bahn) stations
U2 (Berlin U-Bahn) stations
U3 (Berlin U-Bahn) stations
U4 (Berlin U-Bahn) stations
Heritage sites in Berlin
Buildings and structures in Tempelhof-Schöneberg
Railway stations in Germany opened in 1902
Art Nouveau architecture in Berlin
Art Nouveau railway stations
Cremer & Wolffenstein